Holy Trinity Church, Bulcote is a Grade II listed parish church in the Church of England in Bulcote.

History

It was built in as a chapel of ease in 1862.

It is in a joint parish with two other churches:
St Helen's Church, Burton Joyce
St Luke's Church, Stoke Bardolph

Organ

The organ dates from 1862 and is by Lloyd and Dudgeon. A specification of the organ can be found on the National Pipe Organ Register.

See also
Listed buildings in Bulcote

References

Church of England church buildings in Nottinghamshire
Grade II listed churches in Nottinghamshire
Churches completed in 1862
1862 establishments in England